Myers Township is a township in Grundy County, in the U.S. state of Missouri.

Myers Township was established in 1872, and named after Lewis and Milton Myers, pioneer citizens.

References

Townships in Missouri
Townships in Grundy County, Missouri